Forteau is a town in the Canadian province of Newfoundland and Labrador. The town had a population of 409 as of the Canada 2016 Census.

The town is located along Route 510 in Labrador, between L'Anse-au-Clair and L'Anse-au-Loup.

There is a health centre, a post office and a variety of shops. Internet access is available but some areas do not have consistent cell phone service.

History
The end of war with France and America saw the growth of trade between Jersey and the New World, especially Canada. By 1763, around a third of the fish being exported from Conception Bay was carried by Jersey vessels. In the 1780s, a number of Jersey families settled permanently, such as the de Quettevilles in Forteau.

Demographics 

References

See also
 List of cities and towns in Newfoundland and Labrador
 

Towns in Newfoundland and Labrador
Populated places in Labrador